Atsina, or Gros Ventre (also known as Ananin, Ahahnelin, Ahe, A’ani, and ʔɔʔɔɔɔniiih), was the ancestral language of the Gros Ventre people of Montana. The last fluent speaker died in 2007, though revitalization efforts are underway.

History 
Atsina is the name applied by specialists in Algonquian linguistics. Arapaho and Atsina are dialects of a common language usually designated by scholars as "Arapaho-Atsina". Historically, this language had five dialects, and on occasion specialists add a third dialect name to the label, resulting in the designation, "Arapaho-Atsina-Nawathinehena".

Theresa Lamebull taught the language at Fort Belknap College (now Aaniiih Nakoda College), and helped develop a dictionary using the Phraselator when she was 109.

As of 2012, the White Clay Immersion School at Aaniiih Nakoda College was teaching the language to 26 students, up from 11 students in 2006.

Phonology

Consonants

Vowels

Notes

References

Further reading

External links
 Native Languages of the Americas: Gros Ventre (Ahe, Ahahnelin, Aane, Atsina)
 Gros Ventre Language Word Sets, Fort Belknap College
 Gros Ventre Dictionary
 OLAC Record entry for Gros Ventre

Gros Ventre
Plains Algonquian languages
Indigenous languages of the North American Plains
Indigenous languages of Montana
Endangered Algic languages
Endangered languages of the United States
Native American language revitalization
Endangered indigenous languages of the Americas